Peggy Antonio (2 June 1917 – 11 January 2002, Melbourne, Australia) was an Australian women's Test cricketer, known as the "Girl Grimmett".

Antonio was raised in Port Melbourne, Victoria, a working class suburb of Melbourne.  Her father was a Chilean docker of French and Spanish descent who died when she was 15 months.  With the encouragement of her uncle she learnt her cricket from the boys in her neighbourhood streets.  As a young girl during the Great Depression, she was lucky enough to find work at a shoe factory in the industrial suburb of Collingwood.  The factory was home to a women's cricket team where Antonio came to the attention of Eddie Conlon, a club cricketer with an encyclopaedic knowledge of the game.  With the assistance of Conlon, Antonio developed a rare mix of leg spin and off spin, including a top spinner and a wrong'un.

She came to the attention of the Australian Women's Cricket Council and was invited to play for Victoria against the travelling English team.  Taking 10/48, including the star batswoman, Molly Hide, she was selected to represent Australia in the inaugural women's Test match at the Brisbane Exhibition Ground at the age of 17.  The first Australian to take a wicket in women's Test cricket, Antonio took twelve wickets in the three Test series and was considered suitable for a publicity date with the great Don Bradman.

Invited to tour England in 1937, the £75 passage was beyond the means of a shoe factory worker and her family.  A campaign started and thanks mainly to the generosity of James McLeod, a businessman and sometime acquaintance of her late father, the necessary funds were raised to allow her to take her place in the squad.  Antonio proved successful again on the tour taking 9/101 in Northampton and 8/65 at Blackpool.

The final Test of the series at The Oval would be Antonio's last.  Tiring of the grind and no longer finding the game enjoyable, she retired from cricket at the age of 20.  In 1943 she married Eddie Howard, an Englishman resident in Australia, and settled down into domestic life, raising a large family.  She died in Melbourne in 2002.

References

Further reading

 

Australia women Test cricketers
Australian people of Chilean descent
Sportspeople of Chilean descent
Australian people of Spanish descent
Sportspeople of Spanish descent
Australian people of French descent
1917 births
2002 deaths
Cricketers from Melbourne
Victoria women cricketers
People from Port Melbourne